The Song on the Rock is a 1926 Soviet silent historical drama film directed by Leo Moor.

References

Bibliography 
 Christie, Ian & Taylor, Richard. The Film Factory: Russian and Soviet Cinema in Documents 1896-1939. Routledge, 2012.

External links 
 

1926 films
1920s historical drama films
Soviet historical drama films
Soviet silent films
1920s Russian-language films
Soviet black-and-white films
1926 drama films
Silent historical drama films